Fernando Pacheco Filho also known as Zeba (born 25 May 1983) is a former Brazilian handball player who played for the Brazilian national team. He competed in the 2008 Summer Olympics, where the Brazilian team placed 11th.

Achievements
Pan American Men's Club Handball Championship:
2015

References

External links
Profile – UOL 

1983 births
Living people
Brazilian male handball players
Olympic handball players of Brazil
Handball players at the 2008 Summer Olympics
Sportspeople from Niterói
Pan American Games silver medalists for Brazil
Liga ASOBAL players
BM Granollers players
Brazilian expatriate sportspeople in Spain
Handball players at the 2007 Pan American Games
Handball players at the 2011 Pan American Games
Handball players at the 2015 Pan American Games
Pan American Games medalists in handball
Pan American Games gold medalists for Brazil
Medalists at the 2007 Pan American Games
Medalists at the 2015 Pan American Games
21st-century Brazilian people